Benaam  is a 1974 Bollywood thriller film directed by Narendra Bedi. The film stars Amitabh Bachchan, Moushumi Chatterjee and Prem Chopra. Madan Puri also appears in a very different role. The scenes between Amitabh Bachchan and Madan Puri are conceived nicely where both are effective. The core plot has loose resemblance to Alfred Hitchcock's The Man Who Knew Too Much (1956). The film was remade in Kannada as Thirugu Baana with Ambarish reprising role of Amitabh Bachchan as protagonist and Aarathi reprising the role of Moushumi Chatterjee.

Plot
Sheela (Moushumi Chatterjee) and Amit Shrivastav (Amitabh Bachchan) are a married couple having a son. One night on their way to a party, they witness a murder attempt on a press reporter. Amit admits the victim, who is in a critical condition, to a hospital. He had found a torn part of an invitation at the place of the attempted murder which he had pocketed. Soon afterwards, Amit begins to receive anonymous threats to hand over the evidence that he has. Amit's son is kidnapped and an unknown person starts blackmailing Amit into doing what that person dictates. The only way to save his child is to unravel the mystery of that person's identity. Amit with the help of Inspector Jadhav (Satyen Kappu) finally finds the culprit and saves his son.

Cast
Amitabh Bachchan as Amit Shrivastav 
Moushumi Chatterjee as Sheela Shrivastav 
Prem Chopra as Kishanlal 
Madan Puri as Gopal 
Iftekhar as Police Commissioner
Satyen Kappu as Inspector Jadav
Dhumal as Police Constable
Shubha Khote as Chachi
Jagdish Raj as Mr. Desai 
D.K. Sapru as Mr. Sharma  
Viju Khote as Salim 
Kader Khan as Voice On Phone Call
Helen as Poonam
 Dev Kishen as Astrologer
 Rajpal as Tony, Amit's office colleague

Soundtrack

External links
 

1974 films
1970s Hindi-language films
Indian thriller drama films
Hindi films remade in other languages
Films directed by Narendra Bedi
Films scored by R. D. Burman
1970s thriller drama films
1974 drama films